In number theory, the Stark conjectures,  introduced  by  and later  expanded by , give conjectural information about the coefficient of the leading term in the Taylor expansion of an Artin L-function associated with a Galois extension K/k of algebraic number fields. The conjectures  generalize the analytic class number formula expressing the leading coefficient of the Taylor series for the Dedekind zeta function of a number field as the product of a regulator related to S-units of the field and a rational number.  When K/k is an abelian extension and the order of vanishing of the L-function at s = 0 is one, Stark gave a refinement of his conjecture, predicting the existence of certain S-units, called Stark units.   and Cristian Dumitru Popescu gave extensions of this refined conjecture to higher orders of vanishing.

Formulation

The Stark conjectures, in the most general form, predict that the leading coefficient of an Artin L-function is the product of a type of regulator, the Stark regulator, with an algebraic number.  When the extension is abelian and the order of vanishing of an L-function at s = 0 is one, Stark's refined conjecture predicts the existence of the Stark units, whose roots generate Kummer extensions of K that are abelian over the base field k (and not just abelian over K, as Kummer theory implies).  As such, this refinement of his conjecture has theoretical implications for solving Hilbert's twelfth problem.  Also, it is possible to compute Stark units in specific examples, allowing verification of the veracity of his refined conjecture as well as providing an important computational tool for generating abelian extensions of number fields.  In fact, some standard algorithms for computing abelian extensions of number fields involve producing Stark units that generate the extensions (see below).

Computation

The first order zero conjectures are used in recent versions of the PARI/GP computer algebra system to compute Hilbert class fields of totally real number fields, and the conjectures provide one solution to Hilbert's twelfth problem, which challenged mathematicians to show how class fields may be constructed over any number field by the methods of complex analysis.

Progress

Stark's principal conjecture has been proven in various special cases, including the case where the character defining the L-function takes on only rational values. Except when the base field is the field of rational numbers or an imaginary quadratic field, the abelian Stark conjectures are still unproved in number fields, and more progress has been made in function fields of an algebraic variety.

 related Stark's conjectures to the noncommutative geometry of Alain Connes. This provides a conceptual framework for studying the conjectures, although at the moment it is unclear whether Manin's techniques will yield the actual proof.

Recent progress has been made by Dasgupta and Kakde.

Notes

References

External links

Conjectures
Unsolved problems in number theory
Field (mathematics)
Algebraic number theory
Zeta and L-functions